Manthiran is a 2005 Indian Tamil-language romantic drama film directed by  Ravichandran and starring Hamsavardhan and Shruthi Raj. The film is based on the story of Pon Navarasu.

Cast 
Hamsavardhan as Hamsa 
Shruthi Raj as Abhi 
Rajan P. Dev as a local gangster
Sukumar
Delhi Ganesh as House owner
Ravichandran in a cameo appearance
Abhinayashree in a cameo appearance

Production 
Ravichandran made his debut as a director with this film. The film stars his son, Hamsavardhan, in the lead role, and his co-produced by Balaji, Hamsavardhan's brother. Raga debuts as the heroine with this film and Abhinayashree worked on an item number. The songs are choreographed by Sridhar and K. Sivasankar.

Release 
Sify wrote that "Hardly a twist, Mandiran is as soggy as the recent rains". Chennai Online wrote "The young actor [Hamsavardhan], with some forgettable films behind him, has handled his role with competence, using his body language and voice modulation to good effect". The film was unsuccessful at the box office.

References 

2005 directorial debut films
2005 films
Indian romantic drama films
2005 romantic drama films